The scarlet kingsnake or scarlet milk snake (Lampropeltis elapsoides) is a species of kingsnake found in the southeastern and eastern portions of the United States. Like all kingsnakes, they are nonvenomous. They are found in pine flatwoods, hydric hammocks, pine savannas, mesic pine-oak forests, prairies, cultivated fields, and a variety of suburban habitats; not unusually, people find scarlet kingsnakes in their swimming pools, especially during the spring. Until recently, and for much of the 20th century, scarlet kingsnakes were considered a subspecies of the milk snake; however, Pyron and Bubrink demonstrated the phylogenetic distinction of this species and its closer relationship to the mountain kingsnakes of the southwestern United States. The maximum recorded length is in Jonesboro, AR .

Taxonomy 

The generic name, Lampropeltis, is derived from the Ancient Greek lamprós (λαμπρος) meaning "shiny" and peltas (πελτας) meaning "shield", after the sheen of their scales.  Its specific name, elapsoides, is a Latinization of the Greek word éllops (ελλοπς) which refers to coral and was used to describe the 19th century genus, Elaps (the type genus of the family Elapidae), which included the eastern coral snake (Micrurus fulvius), a venomous species which the scarlet kingsnake resembles and with which the scarlet kingsnake is partly sympatric. The range of scarlet kingsnakes extends considerably further north and northeast than the eastern coral snake.

The scarlet kingsnake  was once believed to have intergraded with the eastern milk snake, which produced a variation once named as a subspecies called the Coastal Plains milk snake (L. t. temporalis), but this is no longer recognized as a legitimate taxon.

Description

Scarlet kingsnakes have a tricolored pattern of black, red, white, and various shades of yellow bands that appear to mimic the venomous coral snake in a form of Batesian mimicry. A method to help differentiate between venomous and non-venomous tricolor snakes in North America is found in the popular phrases "red on yellow, kill a fellow; red on black, venom lack", "red on yellow's a deadly fellow; yellow on black's a friendly Jack", "if red touches yellow, you're a dead fellow; if red touches black, you're all right, Jack", and "red and black is a friend of Jack" as well as "red on black, friend of Jack; red on yellow, kill a fellow" and "red band near black, venom lack; red band near yellow, bite a fellow". For tri-colored snakes found east of the Mississippi River, all of these phrases can be replaced with the simple phrase, "Red face, I'm safe", in reference to the red snout of scarlet kingsnakes as opposed to the prominent black snout of the eastern coral snake (Micrurus fulvius).

Scarlet kingsnakes are born with white, black, and red banding. As they mature, they develop varying shades of yellow within geographic areas where this is expressed. In addition, the yellowing is not uniform, but rather this pigmentation proceeds from lighter to darker from the lowermost scales upward to the dorsum, or "back", presenting a multiple yellowish band.  Early expression of yellowing appears as early as 3 months and continues through the first 3 years. As adults age,  a gradual darkening of the yellowish banding occurs. The yellow pigmentation varies from lemon, to school-bus yellow, to tangerine, to apricot.

Scarlet kingsnakes are secretive, nocturnal, fossorial snakes, so are infrequently seen by people. They are excellent climbers.  They can be found underneath the loose bark on rotting pines (which is a favorite place for them to hide during spring or during heavy rains), under the bark on dying or decaying pines and their stumps, and decaying wood, where they hunt for their favorite prey, small snakes and lizards, especially skinks. Hatchling scarlet kingsnakes show a strong predisposition for ground skinks (Scincella lateralis), often to the exclusion of other prey items.

Reproduction
The scarlet kingsnake is polygynadreous. Their breeding season is March-June, and females have multiple egg clutches that incubate for 40-65 days.

In other media

Film
A scarlet kingsnake was used to simulate a coral snake in the 2006 film Snakes on a Plane. A scarlet kingsnake also appears briefly as an unidentified venomous snake in an early scene of 2001 film The Mummy Returns.

Television
In Season 5 of Peep Show Super Hans rents a scarlet kingsnake as a prop for a house party. Despite Hans' mnemonic stating "Red next to black, jump the fuck back, red next to yellow, cuddly fellow", kingsnakes are not venomous.

References

Further reading
Conant, Roger. 1975. A Field Guide to Reptiles and Amphibians of Eastern and Central North America, Second Edition. Boston: Houghton Mifflin. xviii + 429 pp.  (hardcover),  (paperback). (Lampropeltis triangulum elapsoides, p. 209 + Plate 30 + Map 153.)
Holbrook, John Edwards. 1936. North American Herpetology; or, A Description of the Reptiles Inhabiting the United States. Vol. II. Philadelphia: J. Dobson. 130 pp. + Plates I.- XXX. (Coluber elapsoides, pp. 123–125 + Plate XXVIII.)
Schmidt, Karl P.; Davis, D. Dwight. 1941. Field Book of Snakes of the United States and Canada. New York: G.P. Putnam's Sons. 365 pp. (Lampropeltis elapsoides, p. 173 + Plate 6.)
Smith, Hobart M.; Brodie, Edmund D., Jr. 1982. Reptiles of North America: A Guide to Field Identification. New York: Golden Press. 240 pp. . (Lampropeltis triangulum elapsoides, pp. 180–181.)
Wright, Albert Hazen; Wright, Anna Allen. 1957. Handbook of Snakes of the United States and Canada. Ithaca and London: Comstock. 1,105 pp. (in two volumes) (Lampropeltis doliata doliata, pp. 351–355, Figure 106 + Map 31 on p. 338.)

Scarlet Kingsnake
Snakes of North America
Reptiles of the United States
Fauna of the Southeastern United States
Reptiles described in 1838
Taxa named by John Edwards Holbrook